The Arya Pratinidhi Sabha of Fiji (Arya Representative Society) is the national body for all the Arya Samajs in Fiji.  It was formed in 1918 and registered as a religious body through the efforts of Manilal Doctor, who was in Fiji from 1912 to 1920 at the behest of Mahatma Gandhi to provide legal assistance to the Fiji Indians. Its first President was Swami Manoharanand Saraswati who had arrived  in Fiji, from India, in 1913. The Arya Pratinidhi Sabha of Fiji is affiliated to Sarvadeshik Arya Pratinidhi Sabha (World Council of Arya Samaj) based in New Delhi.

Immediately after its formation the Sabha went about establishing schools in Fiji, with the first one, Gyrykul Primary School, established in 1918 in Saweni, Lautoka. The Sabha owns and manages 14 pre-schools, 18 primary schools, 7 secondary schools, a commercial school, a religious training centre, a youth development centre and has provided the facilities and resources for the establishment of the University of Fiji.

Educational institutions

President and Secretary
The following is a list of the President and Secretary of the Sabha and year when they were first elected.

At present there are 11 Arya Samajs affiliated to the Sabha and its president is Kamlesh Kumar Arya.

References

External links
 Arya Pratinidhi Sabha of Fiji

Arya Samaj
Hinduism in Fiji
History of Fiji
Fiji Indian organisations
1918 establishments in the British Empire
Overseas Indian organisations
Indian diaspora